Fylingdales is a civil parish in the Scarborough district of North Yorkshire, England situated south of Whitby, within the North York Moors National Park. It contains the villages of Robin Hood's Bay and Fylingthorpe and Fyling Hall School.

According to the 2011 UK census, Fylingdales parish had a population of 1,346, a reduction on the 2001 UK census figure of 1,485.

History
Now similar to Fyllingsdalen, Fylingdales was recorded as Figclinge in the 11th century, Figelinge, Figelingam and Fielinge in the 11th and 12th centuries and possibly as Saxeby in the 12th century. The name derives from Fygla's people. It was a  parochial chapelry south of Whitby and contained the villages of Robin Hood's Bay and Thorpe, or Fylingthorpe (which was recorded as Prestethorpe in the 13th century) and the hamlets of Normanby, Parkgate, Ramsdale, Raw (Fyling Rawe, 16th century) and Stoupe Brow. The church, dedicated to St Stephen replaced an ancient chapel which had Saxon origins and was demolished in about 1821 and was a dependent chapel of Whitby Abbey.

Fyling Old Hall is in Fylingthorpe not far from the Fyling Beck and was leased by the abbey in 1539. It is built in sandstone with a slate roof and mullioned windows. Sir Hugh Cholmley sold Fyling Hall in 1634 to Sir John Hotham whose descendants held the estate including the hall and mill until the 18th century.

The moor within the parishes of Fylingdales and Hawsker-cum-Stainsacre is managed by the ancient Manor of Fyling Court Leet. Courts Leet can be traced to Norman times, and the Manor of Fyling Court Leet was mentioned and recognised in the Administration of Justices Act 1977 to continue to transact the "Management of the Commons in the Manor".

Geography
The chief crops grown were barley and oats but most of the land was in pasture or moorland. The cliffs are Upper Lias shale capped by Dogger and False Bedded Sandstones and shales of the Lower Oolite. Alum was worked at Stoupe Brow and Peak. There were brick and tile-works at High Normanby and at Quarry Hill, Raw.

The moorland has been designated a Site of Special Scientific Interest (SSSI) and is managed by the Manor Court.

RAF Fylingdales
The Tri-Partite site known as RAF Fylingdales is named after the place but is not actually in the parish. Originally planned to be built on a site at Grouse Hill within Fylingdales, the site was moved due to coastal erosion concerns, and the name was not changed as it was preferable to being called RAF Snod Hill (Snod Hill is where it is actually located) and it sits at the western edge of Fylingdales Moor.

Sport 
Fylingdales Cricket Club is in Middlewood Lane, about one kilometre south east of Fylingthorpe village. The club have two senior teams: a Saturday 1st XI that compete in the Scarborough Beckett Cricket League, a Midweek Senior XI in the Esk Valley Evening League and a junior section that compete in the Derwent Valley Junior Cricket League.

See also
 The Fylingdales Group of Artists

References

External links

Local tourist information website for Robin Hood's Bay area

Civil parishes in North Yorkshire